Derrick "DJ" Townsel (born July 12, 1988) is a former gridiron football wide receiver. He most recently played for the Edmonton Eskimos of the Canadian Football League. He was signed by the Jacksonville Jaguars as an undrafted free agent in 2010. He played college football at Murray State.

Professional career

Jacksonville Jaguars
Townsel was signed by the Jacksonville Jaguars as an undrafted free agent following the 2010 NFL Draft on August 5, 2010. He was waived on August 17 to make room for linebacker Rod Wilson.

Houston Texans
Townsel was signed by the Houston Texans on August 23. He was waived during final cuts on September 3, but was re-signed to the team's practice squad on September 8. He was promoted to the active roster on December 15. He appeared in one game for the 2010 season.

Edmonton Eskimos
Townsel was signed by the Edmonton Eskimos on January 10, 2012.  He was released during training camp on June 17, 2012.

Orlando Predators
Townsel was assigned to the Orlando Predators of the Arena Football League in 2013. Townsel was reassigned before the Predators' first game of the season, but was assigned to the Predators again, following their Week 1 game.

Television
In 2019, Townsel was a contestant on The Titan Games. During biographical footage used in the series, Townsel revealed that since his football career, he has become a professional yogi. In The Titan Games he conquered Mount Olympus against Matt Cable to become a Titan.

References

External links
Houston Texans bio
Jacksonville Jaguars bio

1988 births
Living people
American football wide receivers
Edmonton Elks players
Houston Texans players
Jacksonville Jaguars players
Omaha Nighthawks players
Orlando Predators players
Murray State Racers football players
Sportspeople from Miami-Dade County, Florida